Catherine Hay Thomson (? - 1928) was a Scottish-born Australian undercover journalist, literary agent and educator.

Early life and education 
Catherine Hay Thomson was born in Glasgow, educated in Melbourne and was one of the early female graduates from the University of Melbourne.

Career 
Thomson was principal of Queen's College, Ballarat for some time. In 1881 she opened a boarding and day school for girls in Spring Street, Melbourne.

Thomson began writing investigative articles, being referred to in The Bulletin in 1886 as "the female 'Vagabond' of Melbourne".  Thomson worked as an undercover journalist, disguising herself as a man to visit  brothels and taverns investigating corruption which was exposed in her newspaper articles. She investigated undercover as an attendant at the Kew Asylum, a psychiatric hospital in Melbourne and also as an assistant nurse at the Melbourne Hospital.

Thomson was one of the founders of the Austral Salon in 1890, a women’s club to foster literature, music and the arts. In 1899, Thomson and Evelyn Gough became joint proprietors of The Sun: An Australian Journal for the Home and Society.  After the magazine merged with Arena in 1903 Thomson became a literary agent.

Thomson founded the National Council of Women of Victoria in 1902.

Personal life 
Thomson married Thomas Floyd Legge in Melbourne in 1918, aged 72. The wedding was held at the Women Writer’s Club. Thomson died in Cheltenham on 24 July 1928.

Works 
 
Thomson, Catherine Hay (August 1906) The Austral Salon: women's clubs in Australia. Womanhood. Vol.16 (93), p.[133]

References 

1928 deaths
Australian women journalists
Australian educators
University of Melbourne alumni
20th-century Australian journalists
Women educators
Year of birth unknown
Literary agents
20th-century Australian women writers